A carbonate fluoride, fluoride carbonate, fluorocarbonate or fluocarbonate is a double salt containing both carbonate and fluoride. The salts are usually insoluble in water, and can have more than one kind of metal cation to make more complex compounds. Rare-earth fluorocarbonates are particularly important as ore minerals for the light rare-earth elements lanthanum, cerium and neodymium. Bastnäsite is the most important source of these elements. Other artificial compounds are under investigation as non-linear optical materials and for transparency in the ultraviolet, with effects over a dozen times greater than Potassium dideuterium phosphate.

Related to this there are also chlorocarbonates and bromocarbonates. Along with these fluorocarbonates form the larger family of halocarbonates. In turn halocarbonates are a part of mixed anion materials. Compounds where fluorine connects to carbon making acids are unstable, fluoroformic acid decomposes to carbon dioxide and hydrogen fluoride, and trifluoromethyl alcohol also breaks up at room temperature. Trifluoromethoxide compounds exist but react with water to yield carbonyl fluoride.

Structures

The structure of the carbonate fluorides is mainly determined by the carbonate anion, as it is the biggest component. The overall structure depends on the ratio of carbonate to everything else, i.e. number (metals and fluorides)/number of carbonates. For ratios from 1.2 to 1.5 the carbonates are in a flat dense arrangement. From 1.5 to 2.3 the orientation is edge on. From 2.5 to 3.3 the arrangement is flat open. With a ratio from 4 to 11, the carbonate arrangement is flat-lacunar.

The simplest formula is LnCO3F, where Ln has a 3+ charge.

For monocations there is A3CO3F, where A is a large ion such as K, Rb or Tl.

For M = alkali metal, and Ln = lanthanide: MLnCO3F2 1:1:1:2; M3Ln(CO3)2F2 3:1:2:2; M2Ln(CO3)2F 2:1:2:1; M4Ln(CO3)2F3·H2O 4:1:2:3; M4Ln2(CO3)3F4 2:3:3:4. M2Ln(CO3)F2 2:1:1:3.

For B = alkaline earth and Ln = lanthanide (a triple-charged ion) BLn(CO3)2F 1:1:2:1; BLn2(CO3)3F2 1:2:3:2 B2Ln3(CO3)5F3 2:3:5:3; B2Ln(CO3)2F3 2:1:2:3; B2Ln(CO3)F5 2:1:1:5 B2Ln(CO3)3F 2:1:3:1; B3Ln(CO3)F7 3:1:1:7; B3Ln2(CO3)5F2 3:2:5:2.

For alkali with dication combinations: MB: MBCO3F MB3(CO3)2F3·H2O.

For dications A and B there is ABCO3F2 with a degenerate case of A = B.

KPb2(CO3)2F is layered. Each layer is like a sandwich, with lead and carbonate in the outer sublayers, and potassium and fluoride in the inner layer. K2.70Pb5.15(CO3)5F3 extends this structure with some of the layers also being a double-decker sandwich of carbonate, fluoride, carbonate, fluoride, carbonate.

In the rare-earth fluorocarbonates the environment for the rare-earth atoms is 9-coordinated. Six oxygen atoms from carbonate are at the apices of a trigonal prism, and fluoride ions cap the rectangular faces of the prism.

Formation
Carbonate fluoride compounds can be formed by a variety of related methods involving heating the precursor ingredients with or without water. Thallous fluoride carbonate was made simply by evaporating a fluoride thallium solution in ethanol and water in air. It absorbed sufficient carbon dioxide to yield the product. Most other carbonate fluorides are very insoluble and need high-temperature water to crystallise from. Supercritical water heated between 350 and 750 °C under pressures around 200 bars can be used. A sealed platinum tube can withstand the heat and pressure. Crystallisation takes about a day. With subcritical water around 200 °C, crystallisation takes about 2 days. This can happen in a teflon-coated pressure autoclave. The starting ingredients can be rare-earth fluorides and alkali carbonates. The high pressure is needed to keep the water liquid and the carbon dioxide under control, otherwise it would escape. If the fluoride levels are low, hydroxide can substitute for the fluoride. Solid-state reactions require even higher temperatures.

Bastnäsite along with lukechangite (and petersenite) can be precipitated from a mixed solution of CeCl3, NaF, and NaOH with carbon dioxide. Another way to make the simple rare-earth fluorocarbonates is to precipitate a rare-earth carbonate from a nitrate solution with ammonium bicarbonate and then add fluoride ions with hydrofluoric acid (HF).

Pb2(CO3)F2 can be made by boiling a water solution of lead nitrate, sodium fluoride and potassium carbonate in a 2:2:1 molar ratio.

Properties

The visible spectrum of fluorocarbonates is determined mainly by the cations contained. Different structures only have slight effect on the absorption spectrum of rare-earth elements. The visible spectrum of the rare-earth fluorocarbonates is almost entirely due to narrow absorption bands from neodymium. In the near infrared around 1000 nm there are some absorption lines due to samarium and around 1547 nm are some absorption features due to praseodymium. Deeper into the infrared, bastnäsite has carbonate absorption lines at 2243, 2312 and 2324 nm. Parisite only has a very weak carbonate absorption at 2324 nm, and synchysite absorbs at 2337 nm.

The infrared spectrum due to vibration of carbon–oxygen bonds in carbonate is affected by how many kinds of position there are for the carbonate ions.

Reactions
An important chemical reaction used to prepare rare-earth elements from their ores, is to roast concentrated rare-earth fluorocarbonates with sulfuric acid at about 200 °C. This is then leached with water. This process liberates carbon dioxide and hydrofluoric acid and yields rare-earth sulfates:
 2 LnCO3F + 3 H2SO4 → Ln2(SO4)3 + 2 HF + 2 H2O + 2 CO2.
Subsequent processing precipitates a double sulfate with sodium sulfate at about 50 °C. The aim is to separate out the rare-earth elements from calcium, aluminium, iron and thorium.

At high enough temperatures the carbonate fluorides lose carbon dioxide, e.g.
 KCu(CO3)F → CuO + KF + CO2
at 340 °C.

The processing of bastnäsite is important, as it is the most commonly mined cerium mineral. When heated in air or oxygen at over 500 °C, bastnäsite oxidises and loses volatiles to form ceria (CeO2). Lukechangite also oxidises to ceria and sodium fluoride (NaF). Ce7O12 results when heated to over 1000 °C.
 2 Ce(CO3F) + O2 → 2 CeO2 + 2 CO2 + F2
 Na3Ce2(CO3F)4F +  O2 → 2 CeO2 + 3 CO2 + NaF + Na2CO3

At 1300 °C Na2CO3 loses CO2, and between 1300 and 1600 °C NaF and Na2O boil off.

When other rare-earth carbonate fluorides are heated, they lose carbon dioxide and form an oxyfluoride:
 LaCO3F → LaOF + CO2

In some rare-earth extraction processes, the roasted ore is then extracted with hydrochloric acid to dissolve rare earths apart from cerium. Cerium is dissolved if the pH is under 0, and thorium is dissolved if it is under 2.

KCdCO3F when heated yields cadmium oxide (CdO) and potassium fluoride (KF).

When lanthanum fluorocarbonate is heated in a hydrogen sulfide, or carbon disulfide vapour around 500 °C, lanthanum fluorosulfide forms:
 LaCO3F +  CO2 → LaSF + 1.5 CO2
Note that this also works for other lanthanides apart from cerium.

When lanthanum carbonate fluoride is heated at 1000 °C with alumina, lanthanum aluminate is produced:
 LaCO3F + 2 Al2O3 → LaAlO3 + CO2 + equiv AlOF

Within the hot part of the Earth's crust, rare-earth fluorocarbonates should react with apatite to form monazite.

Minerals 
Some rare-earth fluorocarbonate minerals exist. They make up most of the economic ores for light rare-earth elements (LREE). These probably result from hydrothermal liquids from granite that contained fluoride. Rare-earth fluorocarbonate minerals can form in bauxite on carbonate rocks, as rare-earth fluoride complexes react with carbonate. Carbonate fluoride compounds of rare-earth elements also occur in carbonatites.

Artificial 
These are non-linear optical crystals in the AMCO3F family
KSrCO3F
KCaCO3F
RbSrCO3F
KCdCO3F
CsPbCO3F
RbPbCO3F
RbMgCO3F
KMgCO3F
RbCdCO3F
CsSrCO3F
RbCaCO3F
KZnCO3F
CsCaCO3F
RbZnCO3F

References

Fluorides
Carbonates
Mixed anion compounds
Double salts